Vier gegen die Bank is a 1976 German crime comedy television film directed by Wolfgang Petersen. It was adapted from the novel The Nixon Recession Caper by Ralph Maloney and was produced for the German television station ARD. In 2016 it was remade under the same title for theatrical release.

Plot
Hartmut Wredel, a respected lawyer, is left unemployed by the recession. At his golf club he discovers that three other members have not paid their membership dues for a while. The men, out-of-work actor Peter Pagodi, fashion designer Benedict Hoffmann, and garage owner Gustav Blümel, have also been hit hard by the recession. Wredel convinces them that a bank robbery is the solution to their problems. They successfully carry out the plan and even escape imprisonment because the police blame the robbery on a separate group of terrorists who were also planning to rob the same bank.

Cast
 Harald Leipnitz as Peter Pagodi
 Walter Kohut as Hartmut Wredel
 Günther Neutze as Gustav Blümel
 Herbert Bötticher as Benedict Hoffmann
 Ingrid van Bergen as Uschi Blümel
 Christine Schuberth as Gaby Pagodi
 Karin Eickelbaum as Angelika Hoffmann
 Gitty Djamal as Christa Wredel
 Otto Sander as Bankleiter
 Hans Schulze as Hauptkommissar Röse
 Uwe Dallmeier as Kommissar Ludendorf
 Karl-Heinz von Hassel as Gangster Manfred
 Hans Dieter Trayer as Kriminalassistent
 Joachim Regelien as Erster Komplize
 Wolf Richard as Zweiter Komplize
 Ulli Chivall as Dritter Komplize
 Helmut Alimonta as Kfz-Meister
 Leopold Gmeinwieser as Taxifahrer
 Horst Pasderski as Feinkosthändler

Production
The film was shot in and around Munich in July 1976.

References

External links
 

1976 television films
1976 films
1970s crime comedy films
Comedy television films
Crime television films
Films based on American novels
Films directed by Wolfgang Petersen
Films scored by Klaus Doldinger
Films set in Munich
Films shot in Munich
German crime comedy films
1970s German-language films
German television films
West German films
1970s heist films
1970s German films
Das Erste original programming